Elzéar or Elzear may refer to:

Elzéar Bédard (1799–1849), lawyer, member of the Legislative Assembly of Lower Canada
Joseph-Elzéar Bernier (1852–1934), Canadian mariner who led expeditions into the Canadian Arctic
Elzéar Auguste Cousin de Dommartin (1768–1799), French general during the French Revolutionary Wars
Elzéar-Henri Juchereau Duchesnay (1809–1871), seigneur, lawyer and political figure in Canada East
Elzear Duquette, Canadian long-distance walker who undertook multiple cross-continental solo endurance walks
Elzéar Genet (1470–1548), French composer of the Renaissance
Elzéar Gérin, (1843–1887), politician in Quebec, Canada
Elzéar Goulet (1836–1870), Métis leader in the Red River Colony, which later became the province of Manitoba, Canada
Bache-Elzéar-Alexandre d'Arbaud de Jouques (1720–1793), French aristocrat and public official
Olivier Elzéar Mathieu (1853–1929), Canadian Roman Catholic priest, academic, and Archbishop of Regina
Victurnien-Henri-Elzéar de Rochechouart de Mortemart, French Navy officer in the War of American Independence
Joseph Louis Elzéar Ortolan (1802–1873), French jurist
Elzéar Abeille de Perrin (1843–1910), French entomologist
Elzéar of Sabran (born 1285), Baron of Ansouis, Count of Ariano from southern France
Elzéar-Alexandre Taschereau (1820–1898), Canadian Cardinal of the Roman Catholic Church
Gabriel-Elzéar Taschereau (1745–1809), member of the Legislative Assembly and Legislative Council of Lower Canada
Henri-Elzéar Taschereau, PC (1836–1911), Canadian jurist and the fourth Chief Justice of Canada
Pierre-Elzéar Taschereau (1805–1845), lawyer and political figure in Quebec
Elzear Torreggiani D.D., O.S.F.C, (1830–1904), Catholic Bishop of Armidale, New South Wales

See also
Saint-Elzéar, Chaudière-Appalaches, Quebec, municipality in Quebec, Canada
Saint-Elzéar, Gaspésie–Îles-de-la-Madeleine, Quebec, municipality in Quebec, Canada
Saint-Elzéar, Laval, Quebec, district in the centre of Laval, Quebec
Karst-de-Saint-Elzéar Biodiversity Reserve, a biodiversity reserve in Gaspésie–Îles-de-la-Madeleine, Quebec, Canada
Saint-Elzéar-de-Témiscouata, municipality in the Bas-Saint-Laurent region of Quebec, Canada